

Hospitals

Karachi 
 Health Oriented Preventive Education (HOPE)
 Abbasi Shaheed Hospital
 Jinnah Postgraduate Medical Centre
 Karachi Institute of Radiotherapy and Nuclear Medicine (KIRAN)
 Lady Dufferin Hospital, Karachi
 National Institute of Cardiovascular Diseases
 PNS Shifa
 Sindh Institute of Skin Diseases
 Sindh Institute of Urology and Transplantation (SIUT)
 Dr. Ziauddin Hospitals
 Aga Khan Hospital for Women
 Nasir Hussain Shaheed Hospital
 Liaquat National Hospital
 Burhani Hospital
 Chiniot General Hospital
 Baqai Hospital
 Holy Family Hospital
 Indus Hospital
 Marie Adelaide Leprosy Centre (MALC)
 Saifee Hospital (Karachi)
 South City Hospital
 Aga Khan University Hospital
 Koohi Goath Hospital

 PNS Rahat Hospital
 Dr. Ruth K. M. Pfau Civil Hospital Karachi

Hyderabad

 The Aga Khan Maternal and Child Care Centre, Hyderabad
 Liaquat University Hospital, Hyderabad/Jamshoro
NIMRA Cancer Hospital
National Institute of Cardiovascular Diseases (NICVD) 
 Sir Cowasjee Jehangir Institute of Psychiatry
 St. Elizabeth's Hospital
Sindh Institute of Ophthalmology & Visual Sciences (SIOVS), Hyderabad
Government Skin Hospital
Isra University Hospital
 Wapda Hospital
 Boulevard Hospital
G.G Jaghrani Hospital, Hirabad, Hyderabad
Lady Diferal American hospital
Maa Jee Hospital 
Jeejal Maa Hospital
Sindh Government Hospital
Bone Care Center
Afzal Junejo Hospital

Sukkur
 Ghulam Muhammad Mahar Medical College teaching Hospital
 National Institute of Cardiovascular Diseases (NICVD), Sukkur chapter
 SIUT Sukkur- Chablani Medical Center
 Wapda Hospital
 Al-Shifa Trust Eye Hospital
 Sindh Rangers Hospital Sukkur
 Red crescent Hospital
 Sindh Government Anwar Paracha Teaching Hospital Sukkur
 Railway Hospital

Larkana
 Civil Hospital, Larkana
 Chandka Medical College Hospital
 Chandka Children Hospital
 Chandka Eye Hospital
 NICVD Larkana Satellite center
 Larkana Institute of Nuclear Medicine & Radiotherapy (Linar)
 SIUT Larkana Center
 Sheikh Zaid Women Hospital

Shaheed Benazirabad 
 People's Medical University Hospital, Nawabshah 
 Nuclear Medicine Oncology & Radiotherapy Institute Nawabshah (NORIN) Shaheed Benazirabad
 Child and Mother Care Hospital Nawabshah
 Benazir Institute Urology and Transplant Hospital (BUIT)Shaheed Benazirabad
 National Institute of Cardiovascular Diseases (NICVD), Nawabshah
 ERWO Eyes Hospital Nawabshah
 Sakrand Taluka Hospital, Shaheed Benazirabad
 Mastoi Bone & Joint Hospital Nawabshah
 City Care Hospital Nawabshah

Khairpur 
 Khairpur Medical College Hospital
 Pir Abdul Qadir Shah Jeelani Institute of Medical Sciences Gambat
 Gambat Liver Transplant Center

Jamshoro

 Nuclear Institute of Medical Radiotherapy (NIMRA)

Kotri
 Bilawal Medical College Hospital, Kotri

Jacobabad
 Jacobabad Institute Of Medical Sciences (JIMS), Jacobabad

Other cities
 Health Oriented Preventive Education, Thatta and Sujawal 
 Civil Hospital Dadu
 Civil Hospital Lumhs Jamshoro
 Civil Hospital (DHQ) Kashmore
 Civil Hospital Gho
 Mother And Child Health Care Hospital Kandhkot, Kashmore
 Civil Hospital Mirpurkhas
 Sant NenuRam Chairitable Hospital Islamkot Tharparkar
 Civil Hospital (DHQ) Mithi, Tharparkar
 Civil Hospital Chachro, Tharparkar
 Civil Hospital Umerkot
 Civil Hospital (DHQ) Sanghar
 MS RBUT Hospital Shikarpur
 Mother and Child Health Care Mini Hospital Chundiko, Nara

 Gambat Institute of Medical Sciences (GIMS) Hospital, Gambat
 Gambat Liver Transplant Unit

References

Sindh
Lists of hospitals in Sindh